Maroš Kováč (born 11 April 1977 in Košice) is a Slovak former road bicycle racer, who competed professionally between 2001 and 2017 for the De Nardi–Pasta Montegrappa and  teams. He now works as a directeur sportif for UCI Continental team .

Major results
Source:

Cyclo-cross

1996–1997
 2nd National Championships
1997–1998
 3rd National Championships
2003–2004
 5th World Military Championships
2004–2005
 3rd Ispaster
2005–2006
 1st  National Championships
 3rd Hlinsko
2006–2007
 2nd National Championships
2007–2008
 3rd National Championships

Road

2001
 1st  Team time trial, National Road Championships
2002
 1st  Team time trial, National Road Championships
 1st Stage 1 Tour d'Egypte
 1st Prologue Presidential Cycling Tour of Turkey
2003
 1st Stage 7 Tour of South China Sea
 2nd Overall Tour d'Egypte
1st Stage 6
 4th Time trial, World Military Championships
2004
 1st  Overall Tour d'Egypte
1st Prologue, Stages 2, 3 & 6
2005
 1st Stage 1 Grand Prix Cycliste de Gemenc
 1st Stage 3 Okolo Slovenska
 3rd Grand Prix Bradlo
 3rd Coupe des Carpathes
 5th Overall Tour d'Egypte
1st Stage 1
2006
 1st  Road race, National Road Championships
 1st Stage 2 Tour de Serbie
 1st Stage 5 Tour du Maroc
 2nd Overall Kosice–Tatry–Kosice
 3rd Overall Grand Prix Cycliste de Gemenc
 3rd Memoriał Andrzeja Trochanowskiego
 4th Overall Tour d'Egypte
 5th Grand Prix Bradlo
 6th Overall Tour of Małopolska
 8th Overall Tour de Taiwan
2007
 Tour d'Egypte
1st Prologue & Stage 4
 1st Stage 2 Presidential Cycling Tour of Turkey
 3rd Road race, National Road Championships
 3rd Overall Kosice–Tatry–Kosice
 3rd Beograd–Cacak
 5th Rutland–Melton CiCLE Classic
 6th Overall Okolo Slovenska
1st Stage 4a (ITT)
 6th GP Hydraulika Mikolasek
2008
 2nd Beograd–Cacak
 2nd Grand Prix Bradlo
 3rd Coupe des Carpathes
 4th Overall Tour of Libya
 6th Overall Vuelta Ciclista Chiapas
 6th Scandinavian Race Uppsala
 8th Overall Umm Al Quwain Race
1st Stage 3
 9th Overall Bałtyk–Karkonosze Tour
2009
 4th Coupe des Carpathes
 6th East Midlands International CiCLE Classic
 7th Grand Prix Kooperativa
2010
 2nd Banja Luka–Beograd I
 3rd Overall Okolo Slovenska
 4th Overall The Paths of King Nikola
1st Stage 2
 4th Central European Tour Miskolc GP
 6th GP Hydraulika Mikolasek
 8th Overall Tour de Serbie
 8th Coupe des Carpathes
 9th Memoriał Henryka Łasaka
2011
 1st Challenge Khouribga, Challenge des phosphates
2012
 1st Tour Bohemia
 1st Stage 2 Kosice–Tatry–Kosice
 1st Stage 3 Czech Cycling Tour
 7th Overall Okolo Slovenska
1st Points classification
 8th Jūrmala Grand Prix
 8th Tallinn–Tartu GP
 10th Coupe des Carpathes
2013
 1st Prologue Sibiu Cycling Tour
 National Road Championships
2nd Road race
2nd Time trial
 2nd Overall Tour du Maroc
 3rd Overall Okolo Slovenska
 4th Memorial Oleg Dyachenko
 4th Central European Tour Miskolc GP
 7th Overall Five Rings of Moscow
 8th Banja Luka–Beograd II
2014
 1st Stage 3 Okolo Slovenska
 2nd Time trial, National Road Championships
 3rd Overall Czech Cycling Tour
1st  Points classification
 8th Grand Prix Královéhradeckého kraje
2015
 1st Stage 4 Okolo Slovenska
 1st Stage 1 Tour de Hongrie
 2nd Time trial, National Road Championships
 2nd Korona Kocich Gór
2016
 2nd Time trial, National Road Championships
 6th Visegrad 4 Bicycle Race – GP Slovakia

Mountain biking and hill climbs

2005
 2nd National Cross-Country Championships
2009
 1st  National Hill Climb Championships
2010
 1st  National Hill Climb Championships

References

External links

1977 births
Living people
Slovak male cyclists
Tour de Guadeloupe cyclists
Sportspeople from Košice